Biye.Com is a 2020 Indian romantic comedy film directed by Abhijit Guha and Sudeshna Roy with ShyamSundar Dey as a producer. It stars Bonny Sengupta, Joey Debroy, Koushani Mukherjee, Pallavi Chatterjee, Payel Sarkar and others.

Cast
Koushani Mukherjee
Bonny Sengupta
Payel Sarkar
Pallavi Chatterjee

References

External links
 

Indian romantic comedy films
Bengali-language Indian films
2020s Bengali-language films
2020 films
Films directed by Abhijit Guha and Sudeshna Roy
Films about Indian weddings